Joe Hanks (born March 27, 1983) is an American professional boxer. He is currently being promoted by Star Boxing.

Professional career
On December 4, 2010, Hanks beat Villi Bloomfield by KO in round 4, on the undercard of Donaire-Sidorenko.
On April 22, 2011, Hanks beat Terrell Nelson via a RTD in 4 rounds. In his next fight, on July 23, 2011 at Hunts Point Produce Market, Bronx, he won a unanimous decision against Alfredo Escalera Jr., which also won him the vacant IBA Americas heavyweight title.
In his next fight on December 3, 2011 against Franklin Edmondson at Greensboro Coliseum Complex, Greensboro, North Carolina, Hanks won by a second-round TKO. Against the Cuban Rafael Pedro on February 4, 2012, at the Times Union Center, Albany, New York, Hanks won by a second-round TKO, as Pedro went down with an apparent dislocated shoulder. Against veteran Marcus Rhode on April 27, 2012, he scored a first-round TKO victory, as Rhode went down three times.

On December 6, 2012, Hanks defeated Maurenzo Smith in Costa Mesa, California, by a 6-round unanimous decision.

Professional boxing record

References

External links

1983 births
Living people
American male boxers
African-American boxers
Boxers from Newark, New Jersey
Heavyweight boxers
21st-century African-American sportspeople
20th-century African-American people